blackSUMMERS'night is the fifth studio album by American R&B singer and songwriter Maxwell. He produced most of the record with longtime collaborator and multi-instrumentalist Hod David; two songs were also co-produced by Stuart Matthewman. The album was released on July 1, 2016, by Columbia Records and charted at number three on the Billboard 200 while garnering widespread acclaim from critics.

Background
blackSUMMERS'night was Maxwell's first record in seven years, following 2009's BLACKsummers'night, which was the first in a planned trilogy of albums whose names were distinguished by the capitalization of letters in one phrase of the same title. Maxwell told The Wall Street Journal in June 2016 that the trilogy is "loosely based on the concept of a night out for a woman named Black Summers". He produced most of blackSUMMERS'night with longtime collaborator Hod David.

Release and promotion 
blackSUMMERS'night was released by Columbia Records on July 1, 2016. In its first week of release, the album charted at number three on the Billboard 200 and sold 59,000 album-equivalent units, 57,000 of which were entire copies of the record. It became the fourth album of Maxwell's career to reach the top 10 of the chart.

To promote the album, "Lake by the Ocean" was released on April 8, 2016, as the lead single. On June 3, a lyric video for the song "1990x" was released. Maxwell also toured the United States in support of the album, performing 29 concert dates from June to August.

Critical reception

blackSUMMERS'night was met with widespread critical acclaim. At Metacritic, which assigns a normalized rating out of 100 to reviews from mainstream publications, the album received an average score of 86, based on 15 reviews.

Reviewing the album in the Los Angeles Times, Lorraine Ali found it charming and evocative while describing Maxwell as a "transcendent", multi-dimensional singer. Jim Farber from Entertainment Weekly said the record "exudes enough confidence to let his heart show and to let his music grow in any direction his muse demands" while offering "fresh textures to familiar soul sounds". In the opinion of Rolling Stones Joe Levy, "the music evokes a tradition disappearing before our eyes – the spiritualized eroticism of Prince, the jazzy soul extensions of Earth, Wind and Fire – without ever being of it." In The Guardian, Dave Simpson called it "a classy comeback collection of anguished R&B".

Paul Mardles was less enthusiastic in The Observer, suggesting the record lacked memorable songs and innovative sounds; apart from funky songs such as "Lake by the Ocean", blackSUMMERS'night makes Maxwell, "in the era of Frank Ocean, look like the yesterday’s man of R&B", Madles wrote. Jim Carroll of The Irish Times also found the music relatively "old-fashioned" and wrote, "there are far too many moments here when he appears to be relying on that rich, chocolate voice to woo you rather than try something different or risky."

Track listing

Personnel
Credits are adapted from AllMusic.

Brandon Carter – cinematography 
Mark Colenburg – drums 
Tom Coyne – mastering 
Hod David – bass, drums, guitar, keyboards, piano, production, synthesizer 
Jesse Gladstone – engineering
Robert Glasper – keyboards, piano, synthesizer 
Keyon Harrold – horn arrangements, trumpet 
Derrick Hodge – bass, keyboards, synthesizer 
Darryl "Lil Man" Howell – drums 
Eric Johnson – photography 
Stuart Matthewman – engineering, mixing, production

Maxwell – production, vocals
Randy Merrill – mastering 
Shedrick Mitchell – bass, keyboards, organ, piano, synthesizer 
Jermaine Parrish – drums 
Mike Pela – engineering, mixing, production
Julian Peploe – design 
Travis Sayles – bass, drum programming, keyboards, synthesizer 
Julian Schratter – multimedia design 
Wayne Trevisani – engineering, mixing, production
LaTina Webb – background vocals
Kenneth Whalum III – horn arrangements, saxophone

Charts

Weekly charts

Year-end charts

References

Further reading

External links
 

2016 albums
Maxwell (musician) albums
Sequel albums